Alessia Arisi (born 10 December 1971) is an Italian table tennis player. She competed at the 1992 Summer Olympics and the 1996 Summer Olympics.

References

1971 births
Living people
Italian female table tennis players
Olympic table tennis players of Italy
Table tennis players at the 1992 Summer Olympics
Table tennis players at the 1996 Summer Olympics
Sportspeople from Parma
20th-century Italian women